Iranians in Qatar accounts for some 30,000 people of the Iranian diaspora.

In 1908 the Qatar population was numbered at 27,000. Out of 27,000 inhabitants there were 425 Iranian boat builders. By the year 1930 the number of Iranians were increased to 5000, an increase of 20% in the population.

See also 
Iran–Qatar relations
Iranian diaspora

References

Ethnic groups in Qatar
 
Qatar
Qatar